The Hope River, in Canterbury, New Zealand, is a tributary of the Waiau Uwha River. It is one of three rivers by that name in the South Island.

The Hope River rises at the Hope Pass in the Southern Alps, which is the main divide for the South Island. The river runs northeast through Lake Sumner Forest Park then south until it turns east along a large valley formed by the Hope Fault, a significant tectonic fault line. The Waiau Uwha enters from a side valley and continues eastward along the Hope Fault's valley before turning south through a gorge near Hanmer Springs.

A walking track follows the river and there are several huts managed by the Department of Conservation.

See also
List of rivers of New Zealand

References

External links

Rivers of Canterbury, New Zealand
Rivers of New Zealand